Beach volleyball at the 2011 All-Africa Games in Maputo, Mozambique was held between September 11–14, 2011.

Medal summary

Medal table

Results

Men

Women

References

External links
Men's Results
Women's Results

2011 All-Africa Games
All-Africa Games
Beach volleyball at the African Games
Volleyball at the African Games